Jeffery Hale - Saint Brigid's is a publicly funded health establishment located in Quebec City, Quebec, Canada.  It provides a range of primary health care services to the population of Quebec's Capitale-Nationale (Greater Quebec City) region.

History 
In 1856, Reverend Father Bernard McGauran founded Saint Brigid's Home as a shelter for Irish immigrants, widows and orphans. In 1864, philanthropist Jeffery Hale left a sum of money in his will to found a hospital to care for Protestants of all denominations.

Merger
In 2007, these two health establishments merged. Jeffery Hale - Saint Brigid's is legally mandated as a residential and long-term care centre (CHSLD - Centre d'hébergement de soins de longue durée) with complementary missions for hospital centre services and community (CLSC-type) services in English.  Jeffery Hale - Saint Brigid's also has the mandate to serve the region's English-speaking population.

References

External links 
 Jeffery Hale - Saint Brigid's - Official Website 
Dictionary of Canadian Biography Online - Hale, Jeffery
 In French only: Guide des archives hospitalières de la région de Québec 1639–1970 Hôpital Jeffery Hale [1865- 
 St. Patrick's Parish - Quebec
 Irish priests in the Diocese of Quebec in the nineteenth century

Hospitals in Quebec City
Hospitals established in 1856